The 2021–22 season is BG Pathum United's second consecutive season in Thai League 1, following promotion in 2019. BG Pathum enters the season as defending league champions, after winning the 2020–21 Thai League 1 title. 

In addition to the domestic league, the club will also compete in this season's editions of the Thai FA Cup and the AFC Champions League.

Squad

Transfer

In

Pre-Season

Note 1: Jardel Capistrano was later moved out on loan.

 Note 2: Peerapong Pichitchotirat move back to the squad after leaving initially.

Mid-Season

Out 
Pre-Season

Note 1: Peerapong Pichitchotirat move back to the team after leaving in pre-season.

Note 2: Thammayut Rakbun returned to the club in the mid-season.

Note 3: Narit Taweekul move to Khon Kaen was made permanent.

Loan Out 
Pre-Season

Mid-Season

Return from loan 
Pre-Season

Note 1: Barros Tardeli moved to Suwon FC in Korea after returning from loan.

Note 2: Toti moved to CD Guijuelo in Spain after returning from loan.

Note 3: Yuki Bamba moved to Navy FC after returning from loan.

Note 4: Nattachai Srisuwan (permanent), Samroeng Hanchiaw and Nattawut Namthip moved to Rajpracha FC after returning from loan.

Note 5: Chalermsak Aukkee moved to Police FC after returning from loan.

Note 6: Piyachanok Darit moved back to Suphanburi on loan after completing the AFC Champions League group matches.

Note 7: Suwannapat Kingkaew moved back to Suphanburi on loan after returning from loan from Rajpracha FC.

Note 8: Tanin Kiatlerttham and Thammayut Tonkham were loaned back to Rajpracha FC for another season.

Note 9: Pardsakorn Sripudpong moved to Chainat Hornbill F.C. after returning from loan.

Note 10: Eakkalak Lungnam was released in 1 July 2021.

Note 11: Athibordee Atirat's loan to Nongbua Pitchaya was recalled, then he was loaned again to Raj Pracha for the rest of the season .

Mid-Season

Extension / Retained

Friendlies

Pre-Season Friendly

Mid-Season Friendly

Competitions

Overview

Champions Cup

Matches

Thai League 1

League table

Matches

Thai FA Cup

Matches

Thai League Cup

Matches

2021 AFC Champions League

Group stage

Knockout stage
Round of 16

2022 AFC Champions League

Group stage

Knockout stage
Round of 16

Quarter-finals

Team statistics

Appearances and goals

Notes

References 

2020
Bangkok Glass